The second Lumbini Provincial Assembly was elected by the 2022 provincial elections on 20 November 2022. 87 members were elected to the assembly, 52 of whom were elected through direct elections and 35 of whom were elected through the party list proportional representation system. The first session of the assembly commenced from 2 January 2023.

Leaders

Officers 

 Speaker of the Assembly: Hon. Tularam Gharti Magar (CPN (Maoist Centre))
 Deputy Speaker of the Assembly: Hon. Menuka Khand K.C. (Rastriya Prajatantra Party)
 Leader of the House (Chief Minister): Hon. Leela Giri (CPN (UML))
 Leader of the Opposition: Hon. Dilli Bahadur Chaudhary (Nepali Congress)

Parliamentary party 

 Parliamentary party leader of CPN (UML): Hon. Leela Giri
 Deputy parliamentary party leader of CPN (UML): Hon. Chet Narayan Acharya
Parliamentary party leader of Nepali Congress: Hon. Dilli Bahadur Chaudhary
Parliamentary party leader of CPN (Maoist Centre): Hon. Jokh Bahadur Mahara
 Parliamentary party leader of Rastriya Prajatantra Party: Hon. Ashish Kumar Chaudhary
 Parliamentary party leader of Nagrik Unmukti Party: Hon. Dharma Bahadur Chaudhary
 Parliamentary party leader of Loktantrik Samajwadi Party: Hon. Santosh Kumar Pandey

Whips 

 Chief Whip of Nagrik Unmukti Party: Hon. Raj Kumar Chaudhary
 Whip of Nagrik Unmukti Party: Hon. Naramaya Dhakal

Composition

Members

Party changes or defections

References

External links 

 समानुपातिक निर्वाचन प्रणाली तर्फको लुम्बिनी प्रदेश सभामा निर्वाचित सदस्यहरुको विवरण

Members of the Provincial Assembly of Lumbini Province